The German navy has operated under different names. See
Prussian Navy, 1701–1867
Reichsflotte (Fleet of the Realm), 1848–52
North German Federal Navy, 1867–71
Imperial German Navy (" Kaiserliche Marine"), 1871–1919
Reichsmarine, 1919–35
Kriegsmarine, 1935–45
German Mine Sweeping Administration, 1945 to 1956
German Navy, since 1956
 Volksmarine the navy of East Germany, 1956–91

 01